Unity Academy may refer to:

Unity Academy Blackpool, an all-through school in Blackpool, Lancashire, England
Unity City Academy, a secondary school in Middlesbrough, North Yorkshire, England

See also
Unity College (disambiguation)
Unity (disambiguation)